Piazza Abbiategrasso is a station on Line 2 of the Milan Metro. It is one of the two southern termini of the line, the other one being Assago Milanofiori Forum. The station was opened on 17 March 2005 as a one-station extension from Famagosta.

References

External links

Line 2 (Milan Metro) stations
Railway stations opened in 2005
2005 establishments in Italy
Railway stations in Italy opened in the 21st century